Parys Mountain is located south of the town of Amlwch in north east Anglesey, Wales. It is the site of a large copper mine that was extensively exploited in the late 18th century. Parys Mountain is a mountain in name only, being a hill with an elevation of less than 150m.

History 
Parys Mountain was mined for copper ore in the early Bronze Age, as shown by sub-surface debris nearly 4,000 years old revealed during excavations in 2002. Since then access has been regained to the sealed underground workings of the Parys mine, revealing further evidence of ancient mining. Parys Mountain is thus one of the few sites in Britain where there is evidence for the prehistoric beginnings of the British metal mining industry.

The 18th century miners recognised that they were following in the steps of much earlier workers, an observation that was then linked to the discovery locally of copper ingots bearing Roman inscriptions.

In 1764, Charles Roe of Macclesfield was granted a 21-year lease by the Bayly family to work the mountain for copper. Rowland Pugh, a local miner, discovered the "Great Lode" on 2 March 1768 and was rewarded with a bottle of whisky and a rent-free house for his lifetime.

Although the ore here was of low quality, this was more than compensated for by the fact that it occurred in two large masses close to the surface. Initially ore was worked on the surface from shallow shafts, next by open-pit mining, and finally underground from adits or shafts. The ore was broken into small lumps by hand, the best ore being shipped to Lancashire or to the Lower Swansea valley in South Wales through the port of Swansea for smelting. Copper was concentrated and extracted from the remainder using kilns and furnaces on site. It was also discovered that purer metal could be obtained efficiently, although in small amounts, by its precipitation from drainage water with scrap iron in purpose-built ponds. Associated with the mines, important chemical industries were established on the mountain based on by-products such as ochre pigments, sulphur, vitriol and alum. The processes were described by the German writer and translator Augustin Gottfried Ludwig Lentin (1764–1823), who visited Parys Mountain in the 1790s and published his findings in Briefe über die Insel Anglesea: vorzüglich über das dasige Kupfer-Bergwerk und die dazu gehörigen Schmelzwerke und Fabriken (Leipzig: Crusius, 1800).

Parys Mountain dominated the world's copper market during the 1780s, when the mine was the largest in Europe. Its rise severely damaged the mining industry in Cornwall. The copper from the mine was used to sheath the British Admiralty's wooden ships of war, to prevent the growth of seaweed and barnacles and to protect the wood from attack by shipworms. This increased the speed and manoeuvrability of the vessels, and enabled them to remain at sea for longer as there was less need to return to port for maintenance.

In response to a national shortage of small currency, the Parys Mine Company produced its own coinage between 1787 and 1793. The Parys Penny, also known as the Anglesey Penny, was used by the mine to pay workers, and also by the populace at large. It is thought that around ten million pennies and half pennies were minted.

The mineral Anglesite, with the chemical formula PbSO4, was first recognised by William Withering in 1783, who discovered it in the Parys copper-mine; the name was given by F. S. Beudant in 1832.

Modern day 

There is a waymarked trail around the mountain, giving views of Amlwch Port to the north and the nearby Trysglwyn wind farm to the south. Those wishing to explore the historic mine levels need to contact the Parys Underground Group.

Since 1988, Anglesey Mining plc, which owns the western part of the mountain, has discovered resources of 6,500,000 tonnes containing 10% combined zinc, lead and copper with some silver and gold. It has permits and a plan to restart mining operations at 350,000 tonnes per year.

In the late 1990s, surveys of the mine's hydraulic systems revealed that a large reservoir held back by a dam in an underground working was in poor condition. An assessment made at the time considered that failure of the dam was likely and that catastrophic failure could inundate parts of Amlwch, causing loss of life and substantial damage to property. An added complication was that the water in the underground reservoir was highly polluted by copper and other metals and was very acidic.

The removal of the reservoir also gave access to many more passages and to a connection to the nearby previously inaccessible Mona Mine. The entry into these sections was filmed for the TV series Extreme Archaeology.

Due to the high level of soil contamination, plant life is sparse on or near the mountain, but there are a number of examples of rare plants and bacteria. The bare, heavily mined landscape give the mountain a strange appearance which has been used in the filming of science fiction films and television shows such as Mortal Kombat: Annihilation.

Due to the high chemical content of the water, snottites thrive in the until recently submerged passages.

Museum 

Mynydd Parys is an anchor point on the European Route of Industrial Heritage.

Geology 

The volcanogenic massive sulfide ore deposit is located at the border of the Ordovician to the Llandovery epoch. The ore is covered by an overlying layer of volcanic rhyolites.

References

External links 

 Web site
 Anglesey Mining plc
 Amlwch Industrial Heritage Trust
 BBC page from History Hunters series
 Parys Mountain – General BBC page
 Portfolio of pictures
 More Images of Parys Mountain

Mountains and hills of Anglesey
Mines in Anglesey
Sites of Special Scientific Interest on Anglesey
European Route of Industrial Heritage Anchor Points
Amlwch
Copper mines in Wales